Handi Morgan Winata or better known as Morgan Oey (born  in Singkawang, West Kalimantan, Indonesia on May 25, 1990) is an Indonesian actor, model and singer of mixed Dayak and Chinese descent. He was a member of the pop group SM*SH from 2010 to 2013.

Discography

As SM*SH Member 
 SM*SH (2011)
 Step Forward (2012)

Solo albums 
 TBA (TBA)

Filmography

Film

Television Drama

Music Video Appearances

Awards and nominations

References

External links 
 
 
 

Living people
1990 births
21st-century Indonesian male singers
Indonesian male television actors
Indonesian pop singers
Indonesian rhythm and blues singers
Indonesian soul singers
Indonesian people of Chinese descent
People from Singkawang